Coedana is a hamlet in Anglesey, in north-west Wales., in the community of Llanerchymedd.

References

Villages in Anglesey
Llannerch-y-medd